The Ivorian Popular Front (abbr. FPI) is a centre-left, democratic socialist and social democratic political party in Ivory Coast.

History 
FPI was founded in exile in 1982 by history professor Laurent Gbagbo, Aboudramane Sangaré, and other allies during the one-party rule of President Félix Houphouët-Boigny. Politically inspired by the French Socialist Party, the FPI was until 2011 a full member of the Socialist International (SI). The expulsion of the FPI from the SI occurred as a result of the 2010–2011 Ivorian crisis.

Gbagbo was sworn in as President after the heavily disputed presidential election of October 22, 2000. In the parliamentary election held on 10 December 2000 and 14 January 2001, the party won 96 out of 225 seats.

The party president is Pascal Affi N'Guessan, a former prime minister. Following Gbagbo's election as President, he was required to step down as party leader, and N'Guessan was elected to head the party at its Third Extraordinary Congress in July 2001.

The Ivorian Popular Front boycotted the 2011 parliamentary election, accusing the electoral commission of bias in favour of Alassane Ouattara and accusing the army of intimidating FPI supporters during the campaign. The party also complained of having been limited in informing the electorate, with the pro-FPI newspaper  having been banned by the government and many of its journalists arrested or jailed.

On 8 August 2015, N'Guessan was designated as the FPI's presidential candidate for the October 2015 presidential election. He denounced the incarceration of Gbagbo by the International Criminal Court and political conditions under Ouattara: "Peace isn't only the silence of weapons. Can we say that Ivory Coast is in peace when President Gbagbo is in The Hague? With hundreds of political prisoners in jail, Ivory Coast is not in peace." Some hardliners in the FPI did not want to participate in elections as long as Gbagbo remained imprisoned, but others felt the party needed to remain engaged in the electoral process.

In the December 2016 parliamentary election, only three FPI candidates, including N'Guessan, were elected to the National Assembly.

On December 23, 2020, the FPI said it would participate in the 2021 Ivorian parliamentary election.

Electoral history

Presidential elections

National Assembly elections

References

1982 establishments in Ivory Coast
Democratic socialist parties in Africa
Former member parties of the Socialist International
Ivorian nationalism
Left-wing nationalist parties
Political parties established in 1982
Political parties in Ivory Coast
Popular fronts
Social democratic parties in Africa
Socialist parties in Ivory Coast